The Helpmann Award for Best Direction of a Play is a theatre award, presented by Live Performance Australia (LPA) at the annual Helpmann Awards since 2001. In the following list winners are listed first and marked in gold, in boldface, and the nominees are listed below with no highlight. Neil Armfield has won the most awards, with four, and is tied the most nominated director with Simon Phillips, both gandering nine nominations.

Winners and nominees

Source:

See also
Helpmann Awards

References

External links
The official Helpmann Awards website

P